KYSK 88.7 FM is a radio station licensed to Ririe, Idaho.  The station broadcasts a Contemporary Christian music format and is owned by Watersprings Ministries.

References

External links
KYSK's official website

Contemporary Christian radio stations in the United States
YSK